Zalesie is a village in the administrative district of Gmina Międzyzdroje, within Kamień County, West Pomeranian Voivodeship, in north-western Poland.

References

Villages in Kamień County